Joseph Hoare (born Ballymahon, 15 March 1842 - died Longford, 14 April 1927) was an Irish Roman Catholic bishop.

Hoare was educated at St Patrick's College, Maynooth and ordained priest on 11 June 1867. He was a curate at Templemichael, County Longford then head teacher at St Mel's College, Longford. He was parish priest of Street, County Westmeath from 1881 to 1887; and then of Carrick on Shannon until his appointment as Bishop of Ardagh and Clonmacnoise in 1895. He died in post.

References

People from County Longford
1842 births
1927 deaths
20th-century Roman Catholic bishops in Ireland
Roman Catholic bishops of Ardagh and Clonmacnoise
Alumni of St Patrick's College, Maynooth
19th-century Roman Catholic bishops in Ireland